Michael Zavros is an Australian artist.

Early life and education
Zavros studied printmaking at Queensland College of Art in the 1990s.

Awards
Zavros has won three Australian drawing prizes: The Jacaranda Acquisitive Drawing Award in 2002, The Robert Jacks Drawing Prize in 2005 and the Kedumba Prize in 2007. In 2004, Zavros won the Primavera Collex award through the Museum of Contemporary Art, Sydney. 

In 2010 Zavros won the Doug Moran National Portrait Prize with a portrait of his child Phoebe is dead/McQueen. The previous year, Zavros was awarded runner up in the Doug Moran National Portrait Prize with a self-portrait entitled V12 Narcissus. In 2012 he won the inaugural Bulgari Art Award, which included the acquisition of his work The new Round Room by the Art Gallery of New South Wales.

In 2016 Zavros was the recipient of the Mosman Art Prize for a portrait of his daughter entitled Flora.

He was a finalist in the Archibald Prize in 2004, 2005, 2006, 2009, 2013 and 2022.

Collections
Zavros has exhibited widely within Australia and his work is held in numerous private and public collections. His portrait of Quentin Bryce, Governor-General 2008–2014, hangs in the National Portrait Gallery, Canberra. His portrait of Victoria Cross recipient Ben Roberts-Smith hangs in the Australian War Memorial, Canberra.

Other roles
From 2007 to 2011 Zavros served on the Visual Arts Board of the Australia Council for the Arts. He was on the board of NAVA (National Association for the Visual Arts) from 2014 to 2019. He sits on the Queensland College of Art (Griffith University) board.

References

                   

1974 births
Living people
Australian painters
Doug Moran National Portrait Prize winners
People from Brisbane
Queensland College of Art alumni
Archibald Prize finalists